Firestorm is the second studio album by Russian symphonic black metal band Tvangeste. It was released on 1 September 2003 via now-defunct Japanese record label Worldchaos Production. It is available in two formats: the usual jewel case CD and the digipak, which contains different cover art and a radio edit of the song "Under the Black Raven's Wings" as a bonus track.

Most of the album's lyrics were written by Russian poet Alexander Marchenko.

A music video was recorded for the track "Under the Black Raven's Wings". "Birth of the Hero" would be included on the soundtrack of the 2009 video game Brütal Legend.

The album can be downloaded for free on Tvangeste's official website.

Track listing

Personnel
 Tvangeste
 Mikhail "Miron" Chirva — vocals, guitar, orchestral arrangements
 Naturelle Chirva — keyboards, vocals, orchestral arrangements
 Vano Mayorov — bass
 Viktoria Kulbachnaya — keyboards
 Nikolay "Kok" Kazmin — guitars

 Session musicians
 Cezary Mielko — drums, percussion

References

External links
 Tvangeste's official website

2003 albums
Tvangeste albums
Albums free for download by copyright owner